The 1885 American Cup was the inaugural edition of this tournament staged by the American Football Association. Six teams contended for the first edition played in the 1884–85 season. Five of the teams were from New Jersey and one from New York. The Association and the tournament itself were the result of the success the game had in the previous winter and fall and despite all the teams coming from a relatively limited area it was anticipated that the game would undoubtedly grow. The draw for the first round was reported in newspapers on October 1 1884 after being conducted by the clubs' secretaries at Paterson. The completion of the trophy was announced several days later. The trophy was exhibited in several places around Newark, Paterson and New York. The trophy, originally valued at $200, was described as having "a neat design in silver and gold appropriate figures of foot ballists being engraved on it". Clark ONT became the first winners of the trophy along with the purse of $150.

Participants 

Clark ONT, established in 1883, played at their association ground in the rear of the Kearny Mills. They wore crimson jerseys, white knickerbockers, and crimson stockings. Paterson wore blue and white striped jerseys, white knickerbockers, and blue stockings. The Domestics, also having blue and white for colors, were composed of employees of the Domestic Manufacturing Company and played at their counterparts baseball ground at Williams Hill. However in March 1885 the Domestic company no longer allowed the baseball club to use that name so they simply became the Newark baseball club and their field also became Newark baseball grounds aka Emmett street grounds. The Kearny Rangers were a football and cricket club established in 1883 with navy shirts and white shorts. The participants hailing from three different cities were as follows:

 New York — New York F.B.C.
 Paterson — Caledonian Thistle Club and Paterson F.B.C.
 Newark — Clark O.N.T., Domestic, and Kearny Rangers.

Venues

First round 

ONT: GK J. Douglas, DF A. Kenworthy, E. Sargent, MF Joe Swithemby, James Howarth, T. Smith, FW J. Spillane, J. Mitchell, Jack Swithemby, James McGurk, William Clark Jr.(c)Domestic: GK W. Hollenbeck, DF J. Corby, F. Ward, MF C. Riker, L. Conklin, FW C. Fairchild, R.O'Toole, H.Chadwick(c), T. Bock, T. Butchford, J.Utter.

Second round 

The secretaries of the remaining three teams met on November 8 in East Newark to make the second round draw which resulted in the Rangers being pitted against New York on Thanksgiving Day with the winner to meet ONT in the final round.

Kearny Rangers: GK D. Ferguson, DF W. Hood, D. Morris, MF John Hood, James Lennox(c), FW R. Raeburn, J. Hill, A. Bolton, H. Ashley, W. Taylor, J.Milner.

Final round 

The final was played in the snow on Valentine's Day. ONT emerged victorious by a score of 2-1, however captain Mitchell of New York entered a protest indicating that some of the ONT players were not members of the club and that the goal posts were not regulation size. The AFA ordered the game replayed at Paterson.

O.N.T.: GK Patrick Hughes, FB Harry Holden, J. Donnelly, HB Joe Swithemby, James Howarth, T. Smith, FW P. Garron, William Thornton, Jack Swithemby(c), Joseph Swarbrick, James McGurk.New York: GK T. Walker, DF A. Johnston, F. Marsterton, MF W. Sinclair, J. Gold, FW A.Mitchell(c), A. Young, J. Lowe, J. Grant, D. Sinclair, D.McNeil.

replay

American Cup Bracket
Home teams listed on top of bracket

(*): replay after protested match

Champions

References

Sources 

 National Police Gazette
 New York Herald
 New York Sun
 Spirit of the Times
 Morning Register
 Daily Advertiser
 Evening News
 Sunday Call

1885
1885 in American soccer